Anu Whakatoro Glacier is an Antarctic glacier  long, between Tūkeri Peak and Spain Peak on the headwall of Ringer Valley in the Saint Johns Range, Victoria Land. “Anu Whakatoro” is a Māori word, meaning force of wind, and was applied descriptively to this glacier by the New Zealand Geographic Board in 2005.

See also
 List of glaciers in the Antarctic
 Glaciology

References 

Glaciers of Scott Coast